The 2013–14 FC Volga Nizhny Novgorod season was the club's 3rd and final season in the Russian Premier League, the highest tier of football in Russia, following their promotion at the end of the 2010 season. They finished the season in 15th place and were relegated from the Premier League. Volga also took part in the 2013–14 Russian Cup, where they were knocked out at the fifth-round stage by SKA-Energiya Khabarovsk.

Squad

Out on loan

Youth team

Transfers

Summer

In:

Out:

Winter

In:

Out:

Competitions

Russian Premier League

Matches

League table

Russian Cup

Squad statistics

Appearances and goals

|-
|colspan="14"|Players away from the club on loan:

|-
|colspan="14"|Players who appeared for Volga Nizhny Novgorod that left during the season:

|}

Goal Scorers

Clean sheets

Disciplinary record

References

FC Volga Nizhny Novgorod seasons
Volga Nizhny Novgorod